Hafid Salhi (born 4 January 1993) is a Dutch professional footballer who plays as a midfielder. He formerly played for FC Lahti and RKC Waalwijk.

References

1993 births
Living people
Dutch footballers
Dutch expatriate footballers
Dutch expatriate sportspeople in Finland
Expatriate footballers in Finland
RKC Waalwijk players
FC Lahti players
Veikkausliiga players
Eerste Divisie players
Association football midfielders
People from Veldhoven